T. S. Durairaj (31 December 1910 – 2 June 1986) was a Tamil film comedian, drama artist, producer and director in the early stages of the Tamil film industry (Kollywood). He received a Kalaimamani award from the Tamil Nadu Government in 2006.

Durairaj interests extended to Derby races. He owned two horses named KIN Master and WIN Master.

Filmography (partial)
Yathabhavishya  or Rambaiyin kaathal (1939) as kesari (debut) ^
Prahalada (1939)
Naveena Vikramadityan (1940)
Sakuntalai (1940)
Madanakamarajan (1941)
Minor-in Kadhal (1941)
Savithiri (1941)
Kubera Kuchela (1943)
Meera (1945)
Chitra (1946)
Sakata Yogam (1946)
Deivaneethi (1947)
Aayiram Thalai Vaangi Apoorva Chinthamani (1947)
Pizhaikkum Vazhi (1948) - Lead role with T. A. Jayalakshmi as heroine
Thirumalisai Alvar (1948)
Mangayarkarasi (1949)
Ezhai Padum Padu (1950)
Kalavathi (1951) - Lead role with T. A. Jayalakshmi as heroine
Manamagal (1951)
Or Iravu (1951)
Kanchana (1952)
Kumari (1952)
Genova (1953)
Malaikkallan (1954)
Kalvanin Kadhali (1955)
Maaman Magal (1955)
Valliyin Selvan (1955)
Kaalam Maari Pochu (1956)
Kudumba Vilakku (1956)
Moondru Pengal (1956)
Pudhu Vazhvu (1957)
Kanniyin Sabatham (1958)
Paanai Pidithaval Bhaagyasaali (1958) - His own production
Maragatham (1959)
Nalla Theerpu (1959)
Padikkadha Medhai (1960)
Kappalottiya Thamizhan (1961)
Kumara Raja (1961)
Pangaaligal (1961)
Nichaya Thaamboolam (1962)

References

External links
 A Burly Comedian of the last century in My Movie Minutes

1910 births
1986 deaths
Tamil male actors
Tamil comedians
Tamil film producers
People from Thanjavur
Indian male comedians
Male actors from Tamil Nadu
20th-century Indian male actors
Film producers from Tamil Nadu
Tamil film directors
20th-century comedians